St. Peter African Methodist Church is a historic church at 518 Franklin Street in Clarksville, Tennessee, United States.  The Gothic Revival church building was constructed in 1873 and added to the National Register of Historic Places in 1982.

References

19th-century Methodist church buildings in the United States
African Methodist Episcopal churches in Tennessee
Churches in Clarksville, Tennessee
Churches completed in 1873
Gothic Revival church buildings in Tennessee
Churches on the National Register of Historic Places in Tennessee
National Register of Historic Places in Montgomery County, Tennessee